Eleazar was a Jewish man whose story is portrayed in 2 Maccabees 6:18-31. Verse 18 describes him as "one of the leading teachers of the law", and "of distinguished bearing". According to verse 24 he was ninety at the time of his death. Under a persecution instigated by Antiochus IV Epiphanes, Eleazar was forced to open his mouth and eat pork, but he spat it out and submitted to flogging. He was then privately permitted to eat meat that he could pretend was pork, but he refused and was flogged to death. The narrator relates that in his death he left "a heroic example and a glorious memory," (verse 31).

Along with the woman with seven sons depicted in the following chapter, although not actually Maccabees, they are celebrated as one of the "Holy Maccabean Martyrs" by the Roman Catholic and Eastern Orthodox churches. In the Eastern Orthodox calendar their feast day is August 1.

Eleazar also appears in the book 3 Maccabees, although that book is generally distrusted as a reliable source of history.  It is set decades earlier than the reign of Antiochus IV in Ptolemaic Egypt rather than Judea.  In it, Eleazar prays for deliverance of the Jews of Egypt, and God sends two invisible angels in response to his prayer who turn Ptolemy's elephants against his own men rather than the Jews.  The Eleazar there is not explicitly identified as the same as the Eleazar of 2 Maccabees, but is described in similar terms, and seems to be a literary reference (as the Eleazar there is already described as old, but should be middle-aged if he was really the same person).

Further reading

References

People in the deuterocanonical books
Jewish martyrs
Books of the Maccabees